Manaos Athletic Club, commonly known as "Manaos Athletic" or "Manaos A.C.", was a Brazilian football club based in Manaus, Amazonas. They won the Campeonato Amazonense twice.

History
The club was founded in 1913. They won the Campeonato Amazonense in 1914 and in 1915. The club eventually folded.

Stadium
Manaos Athletic Club played their home games at Estádio Parque Amazonense. The stadium had a maximum capacity of 12,000 people.

Achievements

 Campeonato Amazonense:
 Winners (2): 1914, 1915

References

Defunct football clubs in Amazonas (Brazilian state)
Association football clubs established in 1913
1913 establishments in Brazil